Eschrichtiidae or the gray whales is a family of baleen whale (Parvorder Mysticeti) with a single extant species, the gray whale (Eschrichtius robustus), as well as three described fossil genera: Archaeschrichtius and Eschrichtioides from the Miocene and Pliocene of Italy respectively, and Gricetoides from the Pliocene of North Carolina. More recent phylogenetic studies have found this family to be invalid, with its members nesting inside the Balaenopteridae. The names of the extant genus and the family honours Danish zoologist Daniel Eschricht.

Taxonomy
In his morphological analysis,  found that eschrichtiids and Cetotheriidae (Cetotherium, Mixocetus and Metopocetus) form a monophyletic sister group of Balaenopteridae.

 found that the gray whale is phylogenetically distinct from rorquals and that previous morphological studies were correct in the conclusion that the evolution of gulp feeding was a single event in the rorqual lineage. In contrast, multiple later studies found the gray whale to fall within the family Balaenopteridae, being more derived than the minke whales but basal to all other members in the family, and reclassified it in Balaenopteridae; the American Society of Mammalogists has followed this classification.

Evolution
Fossils of Eschrichtiidae have been found in all major oceanic basins in the Northern Hemisphere, and the family is believed date back to the Late Miocene.  Today, gray whales are only present in the northern Pacific, but a population was also present in the northern Atlantic before being driven to extinction by European whalers three centuries ago.

Fossil eschrichtiids from before the Holocene are rare compared to other fossil mysticetes.  The only Pleistocene fossil from the Pacific referred to E. eschrichtius is a partial skeleton and an associated skull from California, estimated to be about 200 thousand years old.  However, a late Pliocene fossil from Hokkaido, Japan, referred to Eschrichtius sp. is estimated to be  and a similar unnamed fossil has been reported from California.

References

Notes

Sources

External links

Baleen whales
Miocene cetaceans
Pliocene cetaceans
Pleistocene cetaceans
Extant Miocene first appearances
Mammal families